Isochlora is a genus of moths of the family Noctuidae.

Species

Subgenus Chamyla Staudinger, 1899
Isochlora affinis Draudt, 1935
Isochlora arctomys Alphéraky, 1892
Isochlora atra Hreblay & Gyulai, 1998
Isochlora glaciale Boursin, 1940
Isochlora intricans Alphéraky, 1892
Isochlora metaleuca Ronkay & Gyulai, 1998
Isochlora mirabilis Gyulai & Ronkay, 2006
Isochlora paulusi Gyulai, Ronkay & Huber, 2001
Isochlora salki Gyulai & Ronkay, 1998
Isochlora sericea Lafontaine & Kononenko, 1996
Isochlora vecors Püngeler, 1904
Isochlora zoeldice Gyulai & Ronkay, 2001
Subgenus Grumia Alphéraky, 1899
Isochlora cardinalis Gyulai & Ronkay, 2001
Isochlora carriei Boursin, 1963
Isochlora flora Alphéraky, 1892
Isochlora krausei Boursin, 1963
Isochlora microviridis Gyulai & Ronkay, 2001
Subgenus Isochlora Staudinger, 1882
Isochlora chloroptera Hampson, 1894
Isochlora dagestana Hreblay & Ronkay, 1998
Isochlora eti Gyulai & Ronkay, 2001
Isochlora goliath Hreblay & Plante, 1998
Isochlora grumi Alphéraky, 1892
Isochlora herbacea Alphéraky, 1895
Isochlora leuconeura Püngeler, 1904
Isochlora metaphaea Hampson, 1906
Isochlora minima Hreblay & Ronkay, 1998
Isochlora obscura Chen, 1995
Isochlora ochrea Gyulai & Ronkay, 2001
Isochlora ochreicosta Gyulai & Ronkay, 2006
Isochlora ossicolor Hreblay & Plante, 1998
Isochlora pseudossicolor Gyulai & Ronkay, 2001
Isochlora rubicosta Chen, 1982
Isochlora straminea Leech, 1900
Isochlora viridis Staudinger, 1882
Isochlora viridissima Staudinger, 1882
Isochlora xanthiana Staudinger, 1895
Isochlora xanthisma Chen, 1993
Isochlora yushuensis Chen, 1993

References
Natural History Museum Lepidoptera genus database

Noctuinae